Council of Ministers of the Ukrainian Soviet Socialist Republic was the highest executive and administrative body of state power of the Ukrainian Soviet Socialist Republic, government (1946–1991). The council replaced the Council of People's Commissars that existed in Ukraine since the establishment of the Soviet regime. In April 1991, the council was replaced by the Cabinet of Ministers of the Ukrainian Soviet Socialist Republic which after adaptation of the Declaration of Independence of Ukraine was changed to Cabinet of Ministers of Ukraine.

List of governments
 Khrushchev Government
 Second Korotchenko Government
 First Kalchenko Government
 Second Kalchenko Government
 First Shcherbytsky Government
 Kazanets Government
 Second Shcherbytsky Government
 Third Shcherbytsky Government
 First Lyashko Government
 Second Lyashko Government
 Third Lyashko Government
 First Masol Government

See also
 Ministries of the Ukrainian SSR

External links
 Council of Ministers of the Ukrainian SSR at Ukrainian Soviet Encyclopedia

Political history of Ukraine
Government of Ukraine
Ukraine
Council of Ministers (Ukraine)
1946 in Ukraine
Government of the Ukrainian Soviet Socialist Republic